An outdoor bronze bust of Giuseppe Mazzini by Giovanni Turini is installed in Central Park's Sheep Meadow, in Manhattan, New York. The sculpture was commissioned by a group of Italian-Americans and was dedicated in 1878 with a speech by American poet William Cullen Bryant. It sits on a granite pedestal, which includes two inscriptions that translate to "thought and action" and "God and the people". In 1994, the bust was restored by the Central Park Conservancy.

References

External links
 Central Park: Giuseppe Mazzini, New York City Department of Parks and Recreation

1878 establishments in New York (state)
1878 sculptures
Bronze sculptures in Central Park
Busts in New York City
Monuments and memorials in Manhattan
Outdoor sculptures in Manhattan
Sculptures of men in New York City